The petroleum industry in Singapore is accountable for part of the country's economy, exporting about  of oil (as of 2007). Singapore is dubbed "the undisputed oil hub in Asia."

History
The petroleum industry in Singapore dates back to 1891. In 2007, the country exported approximately 68.1 million tons of petroleum. The same year, the Singaporean government published a report titled Energy for Growth, describing how the industry would be sustained.

Sector organisation

Jurong Island is where most of the country's oil industry's activities take place. Around 95 petroleum organisations are found there. According to The World Fact Book, Singapore produces about 20,170 barrels of crude oil per day, ranking it 78th in the list of the world's oil producing countries. The government-owned Singapore National Oil Corporation (Abbreviation: SNOC) is in charge of the governance of the country's oil industry and protecting it.

Value
Singapore is described as "the undisputed oil hub in Asia". The oil industry is responsible for some five percent of the country's gross domestic product (GDP). It generated an estimated S$57 billion dollars in 2009. Technology used for oil refinement and trading centres in Singapore is on the cutting edge, and many well-established petroleum businesses, such as Exxon Mobil and Lanxess, are based in Singapore, owing to the country's "safe environment" and ideal trading location.

As a global financial hub, Singapore provides for 25 per cent to 35 per cent of commodities trading in Asia, according to International Enterprise Singapore, a government agency. It is also Asia’s largest physical oil trading hub. Additionally, it is home to the world’s largest bunkering port and the world's two largest oil rig builders SembCorp Marine and Keppel Corporation. Singapore traded 21% of the world market of more than 213 million metric tons of bunker fuel in 2019.

Issues

Supply disruption
Singapore has not yet experienced supply disruption of oil. The country has its own reserves of oil, in case of such a crisis.

See also
 Outline of Singapore

References